Juicy Lucy were a British blues rock band based in London. Formed in September 1969, the group originally consisted of former Misunderstood members Glenn Ross Campbell (on steel guitar and mandolin) and Chris Mercer (on saxophone and keyboards), alongside lead vocalist Ray Owen, guitarist Neil Hubbard (formerly of Bluesology), and drummer Pete Dobson. After several lineup changes, the band broke up for the first time in 1972, although later reformed with various members in 1994–1997 and then 2004–2018. At the time of its final dissolution, Juicy Lucy featured vocalist and guitarist Steve "Mr. Fish" Fishwick (who joined in 2004 and took over vocal duties from Owen in 2009), drummer Paul "Fletch" Fletcher (also constant since the 2004 reformation), and bassist Mike Phillips (who joined in 2013).

History
Juicy Lucy were originally formed in September 1969 by former Misunderstood members Glenn Ross Campbell (on steel guitar and mandolin) and Chris Mercer (on saxophone and keyboards). The original lineup, which recorded the band's self-titled debut album, also featured lead vocalist Ray Owen, guitarist Neil Hubbard and drummer Pete Dobson. In early 1970, Owen was replaced by Paul Williams, formerly of Zoot Money's Big Roll Band and John Mayall & the Bluesbreakers. Shortly thereafter, Hubbard and Dobson also left the band, replaced by Micky Moody (formerly with Zoot Money) and Rod Coombes (formerly with Jeff Beck), respectively. This lineup released Lie Back and Enjoy It, before former Fat Mattress bassist Jim Leverton replaced Ellis for 1971's Get a Whiff of This.

Shortly after the album's summer release, founding members Campbell and Mercer left Juicy Lucy, with the former claiming to be "disillusioned" with the band's lack of commercial success. With just Williams and Moody left, the band was rebuilt with the addition of former Blodwyn Pig rhythm section Andy Pyle (bass) and Ron Berg (drums), plus keyboardist Jean Roussel. This lineup released Pieces in early 1972, before Dave Tedstone was added on rhythm guitar in the spring. For a final European tour in the summer, Williams, Moody and Tedstone were joined by Chris Stewart on bass, Mike Deacon on keyboards and Terry Stannard on drums. The group disbanded shortly thereafter, at which point Williams joined Tempest and Moody formed Snafu with vocalist Bobby Harrison.

In 1994, original singer Ray Owen formed a new incarnation of Juicy Lucy with guitarist Mike Jarvis, bassist Andy Doughty and drummer Spencer Blackledge, releasing the album Here She Comes Again in 1995. This lineup disbanded in 1997 and Owen began working with guitarist Steve "Mr. Fish" Fishwick, although a legal dispute over the band's name resulted in a name change to Ray Owen's Moon. During this enforced period of inactivity, a 1996 album called Blue Thunder recorded by Williams and Moody with bassist Peter Stroud, keyboardist David Hentschel and drummer Gary Husband was reissued under the Juicy Lucy name in 1998. After the dispute was settled, Owen and Fishwick reformed Juicy Lucy in mid-2004, joined by bassist Colin Fudge and drummer Paul "Fletch" Fletcher.

The relaunched Juicy Lucy released the EP Raiding the Fruit Bowl in 2005, followed by the first studio album since 1994, Do That and You'll Lose It, the next year. In July 2008, Fudge left the band and was replaced by their manager and producer, James Morris. Just a few weeks later, Owen was hospitalised with a collapsed lung, at which point Fishwick took over lead vocal duties temporarily. Owen returned in November, but was hospitalised again later and ultimately decided to step down from the group in January 2009. By June 2012, Morris had also decided to leave, with Frank Cokayne taking his place. By January 2013 he had been replaced by Len Surtees, who then made way for Mike Phillips in April. In February 2018, Fishwick announced on Facebook that Phillips had left Juicy Lucy.

Despite initially claiming that he and Fletcher were looking for a new bassist, Fishwick announced in May 2018 that Juicy Lucy would be taking "a break to regroup". He later added that he had parted ways with Fletcher. On 31 October 2018, Ray Owen died. Paul Williams died just a few months later on 1 March 2019.

Members

Timeline

Lineups

References

Juicy Lucy